Museveni is a surname. Notable people with the surname include:
Janet Museveni (born 1948), Ugandan politician
Muhoozi Kainerugaba Museveni (born 1974), Ugandan general
Yoweri Museveni (born 1944), Ugandan politician and retired senior military officer

Surnames of Ugandan origin